El tonno was a German flash animated short series created by German comedian Elton. It was broadcast as part of his late-night talk show elton.tv on ProSieben.

External links
Elton's website (formerly official website of the show) 

German animated television series
2002 German television series debuts
2003 German television series endings
ProSieben original programming
German-language television shows